Gordis may refer to:
Agios Gordis, holiday resort in Corfu, Greece
Robert Gordis, leader in Conservative Judaism

See also
 Gordy (disambiguation)